is a Japanese animation studio and production enterprise, founded on December 15, 1987, by Mitsuhisa Ishikawa and headquartered in Musashino, Tokyo, Japan. The letters I and G derive from the names of the company founders: producer Mitsuhisa Ishikawa and character designer Takayuki Goto.

The studio has been involved in the creation of numerous anime television series, OVAs, theatrical films, and is further involved in video game design and development, as well as music publishing and management. Among its prominent works are Guilty Crown, Psycho-Pass, Eden of the East, Haikyu!! and the Ghost in the Shell series. It is known in the video game industry for developing intros, cut-scenes, and artwork for games such as Namco Tales Studio's Tales of Symphonia.

History
Initially founded as "I.G. Tatsunoko Limited" in 1987, it was a break-off branch-studio of Tatsunoko Productions which created Zillion. Mitsuhisa Ishikawa, the producer of Zillion, founded the studio to obstruct the dispersing of the excellent staffs of the Tatsunoko branch. The members of the Tatsunoko Production annex, "" (named after the English word "chime"), which was led by Takayuki Goto, joined the Ishikawa's Tatsunoko Branch that used the same floor. Goto was also the character designer of Zillion. Kyoto Animation, one of the finishers of Zillion, supported Ishikawa and the "IG Tatsunoko Limited" was founded on December 15, 1987. The "IG" letters are referring to the initials of Ishikawa and Goto. The initial shareholders of the studio were Ishikawa, Goto, Hideaki Hatta (Kyoto Animation), Tatsunoko Production, etc. Among "Production I.G" 's earliest most notable works is the feature-length cinematic anime adaptation of the Patlabor story, created by the group Headgear. In 1993, during the final stages of the production of Patlabor 2, the company ended commercial relations with Tatsunoko Production, which was holding 20% of "IG Tatsunoko" 's stocks, and changed its name to the current "Production I.G" on September of that year. Thus, the film Patlabor 2, released on August 1993, became the last product bearing the name "IG Tatsunoko".

In early 1997, fellow Tatsunoko employee Koichi Mashimo made a suggestion to President Ishikawa. Mashimo had conceived the idea of a small studio that could work on small productions and "nurture" the creative spirit of its staff members. Ishikawa liked the idea and sponsored Mashimo's endeavor and studio Bee Train Animation Inc. was formed as a subsidiary company. Production I.G and Ishikawa helped supervise and produce the early productions such as PoPoLoCrois Monogatari, Wild Arms: Twilight Venom, and Arc the Lad. Along with Xebec it was the second subsidiary company under I.G. In 2006, Bee Train became independent and Ishikawa stepped down as an executive in the company. The two studios reunited in 2008 to work on Blade of the Immortal, Batman: Gotham Knight, and again in 2010 for Halo Legends. In 1998, the company incorporated to become "Production I.G, Inc." Following that, Production I.G merged with ING, another production company founded by the same Mitsuhisa Ishikawa in 2000. In a Q&A session Ishikawa said:

It [The I.G in Production I.G] stands for two words: itsumo (always) and genki (happy); you should ask, is that true? In reality, it stands for Ishikawa, and my artist collaborator's name, Takayuki Goto, the initials of our last names. But, now that I am the sole president, we kept the name. But I am happy to say it means Itsumo Genki.

On July 4, 2007, the company announced a merger with Mag Garden, forming a new holding company called IG Port. IG Port has become the parent company of Production I.G, Signal.MD and Wit Studio. Xebec was formerly a part of IG Port until November 20, 2018, when it was sold to Sunrise. On January 12, 2018, it was announced that Xebec's subsidiary, Xebeczwei, had been given to I.G as a subsidiary studio, and that work on Fafner in the Azure: The Beyond would proceed as planned. The studio was planned to be renamed to IGzwei following the transfer.

Production I.G is closer to several divisions working under the same name (such as with Sunrise) than it is to being a single studio. These different studios are known as different "sections" in reference to the studio's Ghost in the Shell franchise. Around 2011, Section 6 head George Wada and animation producer Tetsuya Nakatake approached Ishikawa with the intention of founding a new studio under Production I.G to allow for more creative freedoms and faster production processes than were available at I.G itself. On June 1, 2012, Wit Studio was founded, with the studio's first project being Attack on Titan, which I.G assisted in producing. 

On June 5, 2017, Production I.G launched an anime streaming app called Tate Anime (Vertical Anime). The anime that were streamed on the app were series of shorts that had 10 3-minute long episodes each. In May 2018, it was announced that Tate Anime would be replaced with a new app called Anime Beans. On December 18, 2018, Anime Beans was launched worldwide, excluding China, with 10 titles available with English subtitles.

On June 25, 2022, Production I.G announced that current executive vice-president George Wada is to become President and CEO of the studio, while current President and CEO Mitsuhisa Ishikawa will become Chairman. The changes are to take effect on August 30, 2022.

Works

Television series
Zillion (1987, as I.G. Tatsunoko, with Tatsunoko Production)
Blue Seed (1994–1995, with Ashi Productions)
Popolocrois Monogatari (1998–1999, with Bee Train)
Medabots Damashii (2000–2001, with Trans Arts)
Vampiyan Kids (2001–2002)
PaRappa the Rapper (2001–2002, production co-operation for J.C. Staff)
Ghost in the Shell: Stand Alone Complex (2002–2005)
Cromartie High School (2003–2004)
Windy Tales (2004–2005)
Otogi Zoshi (2004–2005)
Immortal Grand Prix (2005–2006, with Bee Train)
Blood+ (2005–2006)
Le Chevalier D'Eon (2006–2007)
xxxHolic (2006–2008)
Moribito: Guardian of the Spirit (2007)
Reideen (2007)
Ghost Hound (2007–2008)
Ani*Kuri15 (2007, animated segments)
Library War (2008)
Real Drive (2008)
Sands of Destruction (2008)
Erin (2009, with Trans Arts)
Eden of the East (2009)
Sengoku Basara: Samurai Kings (2009)
Sengoku Basara: Samurai Kings II (2010)
Kimi ni Todoke (2009–2011)
Shoka (2010)
Moshidora (2011)
Bunny Drop (2011)
You're Being Summoned, Azazel (2011–2013)
Blood-C (2011)
Guilty Crown (2011–2012)
Kuroko's Basketball (2012–2015)
The Prince of Tennis II (2012, with M.S.C.)
Shining Hearts (2012)
Robotics;Notes (2012–2013)
Psycho-Pass (2012–2013)
Gargantia on the Verdurous Planet (2012–2013)
Genshiken Nidaime (2013)
Ace of Diamond (2013–2016, with Madhouse)
Haikyu!! (2014–2020)
Ao Haru Ride (2014)
Broken Blade (2014, with Xebec)
Maria the Virgin Witch (2015)
Ghost in the Shell: Arise (2015)
Attack on Titan: Junior High (2015)
Pikaia! (2015)
Ghost in the Shell Arise – Alternative Architecture (2015)
Joker Game (2016)
Atom: The Beginning (2017, with OLM and Signal.MD)
Welcome to the Ballroom (2017)
Pikaia!! (2017)
Magical Circle Guru Guru (2017)
Legend of the Galactic Heroes: Die Neue These Kaikō (2018)
FLCL Progressive (2018, episodes 1, 3–4, and 6)
FLCL Alternative (2018, with Revoroot and NUT)
Run with the Wind (2018–2019)
Case File nº221: Kabukicho (2019–2020)
True Cooking Master Boy (2019–2021)
Psycho-Pass 3 (2019)
Noblesse (2020)
Moriarty the Patriot (2020–2021)
Fena: Pirate Princess (2021)
Aoashi (2022)
FLCL: Shoegaze (2023)
Heavenly Delusion (2023)
Kaiju No. 8 (2024)

OVAs
Zillion: Burning Night (1988, as I.G. Tatsunoko)
Eiji (1990, as I.G. Tatsunoko)
The Heroic Legend of Arslan (1991, episode 1, as I.G Tatsunoko)
Video Girl Ai (1992, as I.G. Tatsunoko)
Please Save My Earth (1993–1994)
Dragon Half (1993)
Ryuseiki Gakusaver (1993-1994)
Girl From Phantasia (1993)
Please Save My Earth Sōshūhen Kanzenban: Alice kara, Rin Kun e (1994)
Combustible Campus Guardress (1994)
B.B. Fish (1994)
Bronze: Zetsuai Since 1989 (1994)
You're Under Arrest (1994-1995, episode 4 "on the road, AGAIN", production co-operation for Studio Deen)
Please Save My Earth Music Image Video: Kin'iro no Toki Nagarete (1995)
The Special Duty Combat Unit Shinesman (1996)
Panzer Dragoon (1996)
Blue Seed Beyond (1996, episodes 1–2)
One Piece: Defeat Him! Pirate Ganzack! (1998)
FLCL (2000–2001, with Gainax)
Kai Doh Maru (2001, with IG Plus)
The Prince of Tennis: A Day on Survival Mountain (2003)
Eyeshield 21: The Phantom Golden Bowl (2003)
Ghost in the Shell: Stand Alone Complex – The Laughing Man (2005)
Ghost in the Shell: Stand Alone Complex – Individual Eleven (2006)
Tsubasa Tokyo Revelations (2007–2008)
Tokyo Marble Chocolate (2007)
Blame! Prologue (2007)
Batman: Gotham Knight (2008, episode 2 "Crossfire", in co-operation with Warner Bros and DC Comics)
Halo Legends (2008–2010, episode 2 "The Duel"; episode 5 "Homecoming" with Bee Train)
Library War: Romance Impairment (2008)
xxxHolic Shunmuki (2009)
Tsubasa Shunraiki (2009)
Bungaku Shōjo: Kyō no Oyatsu ~Hatsukoi~ (2009)
Abunai Sisters: Koko & Mika (2009)Book Girl Today's Snack: First Love (2009)xxxHolic Rō (2010)You're Being Summoned, Azazel (2010–2014)Dante's Inferno: An Animated Epic (2010, see page for list of production companies)Book Girl Memoir (2010)Je t'aime (2010)Appleseed XIII (2011–2012, production co-operation for various studios)Computer Kakumei: Saikyō x Saisoku no Zunō Tanjō (2012)Kuroko's Basketball (2013–2017)Vassalord (2013)Ghost in the Shell: Arise (2013–2015)Gargantia on the Verdurous Planet Specials (2013)Pokémon Origins (2013, episode 1)Gargantia on the Verdurous Planet: Far Beyond the Voyage (2014–2015)Ace of Diamond (2014–2015, with Madhouse)Ace of Diamond Second Season (2016, with Madhouse)Haikyū!!: Tokushū! Harukō Volley ni Kaketa Seishun (2017)Haikyū!!: Riku vs Kuu (2020)Case File nº221: Kabukicho (2020)Moriarty the Patriot (2022)

ONAsThe King of Fighters: Another Day (2005–2006)Chocolate Underground (2008)Next A-Class (2012)Mō Hitotsu no Mirai o. (2013–2014)Noblesse: Awakening (2016)Star Fox Zero: The Battle Begins (2016, with Wit Studio)Karada Sagashi (2017)African Office Worker (2017)Neo Yokio (2017, with Studio Deen and MOI Animation)Kodoku no Gourmet (2017)B: The Beginning (2018)Moshi Moshi, Terumi Desu (2018)Holiday Love (2018)15-sai, Kyō Kara Dōsei Hajimemasu. (2018)Caramel Honey (2018)Ultraman (2019–present, with Sola Digital Arts)Sol Levante (2020)Ghost in the Shell: SAC 2045 (2020–2022, with Sola Digital Arts)B: The Beginning Succession (2021)Star Wars: Visions Episode 5 - "The Ninth Jedi" (2021)BRZRKR (TBA)
Untitled Terminator series (TBA)

FilmsThe Weathering Continent (1992, as I.G. Tatsunoko)Patlabor 2: The Movie (1993)Ghost in the Shell (1995)Neon Genesis Evangelion: Death & Rebirth (1997, Rebirth, with Gainax)Neon Genesis Evangelion: The End of Evangelion (1997, with Gainax)
 Cyber Team in Akihabara: Summer Vacation of 2011 (1999; with Xebec)Jin-Roh: The Wolf Brigade (2000)Blood: The Last Vampire (2000)Sakura Wars: The Movie (2001)Kill Bill Vol. 1: Chapter 3 - The Origin of O-Ren (2003, animated sequence)Dead Leaves (2004)Ghost in the Shell 2: Innocence (2004, 3DCG by Polygon Pictures)Tsubasa Reservoir Chronicle the Movie: The Princess in the Birdcage Kingdom (2005)The Prince of Tennis: Atobe Kara no Okurimono (2005)The Prince of Tennis: Futari no Samurai (2005)xxxHolic: A Midsummer Night's Dream (2005)Ghost in the Shell: Stand Alone Complex - Solid State Society (2006)The Sky Crawlers (2008, 3DCG by Polygon Pictures)Tales of Vesperia: The First Strike (2009)Eden of the East: The King of Eden (2009)Oblivion Island: Haruka and the Magic Mirror (2009, 3DCG by Polygon Pictures)Eden of the East: Paradise Lost (2010)Broken Blade (2010–2011, with Xebec, film hexalogy)Book Girl (2010)Hiyokoi (2010)Loups=Garous (2010, with TransArts)Sengoku Basara: The Last Party (2011)Tansu Warashi. (2011)A Letter to Momo (2011)Xi Avant (2011, short film)The Prince of Tennis – The Battle of the British City (2011, with M.S.C)Appleseed XIII: Tartaros (2011, production co-operation for Jinni's Animation Studio)Appleseed XIII: Ouranos (2011, production co-operation for Jinni's Animation Studio)Blood-C: The Last Dark (2012)Library War: The Wings of Revolution (2012)009 Re:Cyborg (2012, with Sanzigen)Wasurenagumo (2012)Mass Effect: Paragon Lost (2012)Kick-Heart (2013)Giovanni's Island (2014)Psycho-Pass: The Movie (2015)Miss Hokusai (2015)Ghost in the Shell: The New Movie (2015)Gekijō-ban Haikyu!! Owari to Hajimari (2015)Gekijō-ban Haikyu!! Shōsha to Haisha (2015)Pigtails (2015)Kuroko's Basketball: Winter Cup Compilation (2016, compilation trilogy)Haikyu!! Sainō to Sense (2017)Haikyu!! Concept no Tatakai (2017)Kuroko's Basketball The Movie: Last Game (2017)Tokimeki Restaurant: Miracle 6 (2018)Psycho-Pass: Sinners of the System (2019, film trilogy)Legend of the Galactic Heroes: The New Thesis - Stellar War (2019, film trilogy)Fafner in the Azure: The Beyond (2019–2021, 12-part film series; credited as animation production, with I.G Zwei credited as Animation Production Studio)Psycho-Pass 3: First Inspector (2020)BEM: Become Human (2020)Fate/Grand Order - Divine Realm of the Round Table: Camelot ~ Paladin; Agaterám ~ (2021; animation production for second film)Ghost in the Shell: SAC_2045 Sustainable War (2021, with Sola Digital Arts)The Deer King (2022)Deemo: Memorial Keys (2022, with Signal.MD)Legend of the Galactic Heroes: The New Thesis - Clash (2022, film trilogy)Legend of the Galactic Heroes: The New Thesis - Intrigue (2022, film trilogy)Fafner in the Azure: Behind the Line (2023)Rakudai Majo (2023)Psycho-Pass: Providence (2023)

Live-action seriesK-tai Investigator 7 (2008-2009)Stay Tuned! (2019)Dragons of Wonderhatch (2023, animated scenes)

Music videosm-flo: Quantum Leap (2000)Linda: Chains & Rings (2003)Mylène Farmer: Peut-être toi (2006)Universe (2007)Eden of the East: Falling Down (2009)NO DOUBT (2017)Marty Friedman: The Perfect World (2018)

Video gamesPower Pros (1994)Tales series (1995–2009)Grandia (1997, CG support)Ghost in the Shell (1997)The Granstream Saga (1997)Yarudora Series Vol. 1: Double Cast (1998, animated cutscenes)Yarudora Series Vol. 2: Kisetsu o Dakishimete (1998, animated cutscenes)Yarudora Series Vol. 3: Sampaguita (1998, animated cutscenes)Yarudora Series Vol. 4: Yukiwari no Hana (1998, animated cutscenes)Tekken 3 (1998, pre-rendered CGI cutscenes and animated cutscene)Xenogears (1998, traditionally animated cutscenes and pre-rendered CGI cutscenes)Sakura Wars 2: Thou Shalt Not Die (1998)Ace Combat 3: Electrosphere (1999, traditionally animated cutscenes)Love & Destroy (1999)Psychometrer Eiji (1999)Valkyrie Profile (1999)Wild Arms 2 (1999)Summon Night (2000)Sakura Wars 3: Is Paris Burning? (2001)Sakura Wars 4: Fall in Love, Maidens (2002)Silk to Cotton (2002, character design)Surveillance Kanshisha (2002)Sakura Wars V Episode 0 (2004)Lethal Enforcers 3 (2004)Popolocrois Monogatari II (2000, opening and animated cutscenes)Fire Emblem: Path of Radiance (2005, CG animated cutscenes)Namco × Capcom (2005)Sonic Riders (2006, opening animation)Children of Mana (2006, opening and animated cutscenes)Valkyrie Profile 2: Silmeria (2006)Fire Emblem: Radiant Dawn (2007, CG animated cutscenes)Star Ocean: First Departure (2007)Star Ocean: Second Evolution (2008)Wario Land: Shake It! (2008, cutscenes and gameplay)Sands of Destruction (2008)The Sky Crawlers: Innocent Aces (2008, CG animated cutscenes)Infinite Space (2009)Valkyria Chronicles III (2011)Kid Icarus: Uprising (2012, Thanatos rising shorts)BlazBlue: Central Fiction (2015)Persona 5 (2016, animated cutscenes, with Domerica)Persona 5 Royal (2019, animated cutscenes, with Domerica)Another Eden'' (2020, opening animation)

References

External links

 
 

 
IG Port
Japanese animation studios
Video production companies
Animation studios in Tokyo
Mass media companies established in 1987
Japanese companies established in 1987